Eduard Khurshudian served as the Ambassador of Armenia to Kazakhstan from 1999 to 20 July 2006.

References

Ambassadors of Armenia to Kazakhstan
Living people
Year of birth missing (living people)
Place of birth missing (living people)